Sid Meier's Covert Action is an action and strategy video game released in 1990 by MicroProse for IBM PC compatibles and Amiga. The player takes the role of Maximillian Remington (or his female counterpart, Maxine), a skilled and deadly free agent hired by CIA, investigating on-going criminal and terrorist activities. Tommo purchased the rights to this game and digitally publishes it through its Retroism brand in 2015.

Gameplay
The gameplay is similar to the 1987 release Pirates!, by the same developer, Sid Meier, in that the gameplay is made up of several self-directed, distinct, and unique modes of play. During the course of a game, the player will be tasked with installing wiretaps, infiltrating enemy safehouses, intercepting and decoding secret messages and interrogating prisoners. The plots are randomly generated each game, which enhances replayability.

The game is broken down into missions, with players possibly receiving promotions after each successful mission. The primary goal of each mission is to uncover details about a criminal conspiracy. Players race against the clock to discover who is involved and their roles before it's too late.

Many of the pieces of data which the player needs are gathered through various mini-games. Successfully completing a mini-game often reveals one or more pieces of data, including the names and photos of those involved, as well as locations connected to the plot. The player is allowed to decide which skills his agent has mastered ahead of time, making the associated mini-games easier.

The longest mini-game is the combat one, which involves infiltrating an enemy building. Players select their equipment, including guns, various types of grenades, and body armor. Once inside, players search desks, safes, and cabinets for clues and photograph them. Enemy agents must be avoided, slain, or knocked unconscious. If the character runs out of health, he is knocked unconscious and must either lose precious time escaping, or agree to a prisoner exchange by freeing captured enemy agents.

During the cryptography mini-game, players attempt to decode a scrambled message within the time limit. Players are given certain known letters to begin with, but must figure out the remaining letter mappings in a substitution cipher.

The driving mini-game involves either the player tailing a suspect or the player fleeing from cars to avoid a confrontation. Cars are represented by small dots on maze-like streets.

In the wiretapping mini-game, players attempt to either cut or connect current flowing through a set of power lines to a number of phone icons while avoiding to connect the current to alarms. By doing so, the player listens in on conversations obtaining therefore clues and evidence. The game is played by rearranging the junctions through which power flows to produce the desired results.

Development
Sid Meier was reportedly dissatisfied with the final product, because he believed that the disparate elements of the game, however good they were individually, detracted from game play. As a result, he developed what he called the "Covert Action Rule": "It's better to have one good game than two great games." He described the origins of this rule in an interview with GameSpot:

Reception
Computer Gaming World praised Covert Action for including both action and "mind-twisting brainwork", and stated that "individual cases take at least half an hour to solve, but they are addictive". The magazine criticized the poor documentation, but concluded that the game "is entertaining in the extreme", comparing it to The Fool's Errand and Starflight.

See also
 Floor 13
 Spycraft: The Great Game

References

External links
 
 Gamespot interview with Sid Meier on Covert Action

1990 video games
Amiga games
Cold War video games
DOS games
Games commercially released with DOSBox
Linux games
MacOS games
MicroProse games
Covert Action
Single-player video games
Spy video games
Video games developed in the United States
Video games scored by Jeff Briggs
Video games featuring female protagonists
Windows games
Tommo games